Aruncus sylvester, the goat's beard, is a species of flowering plant in the family Rosaceae, found from the Himalayas to the Russian Far East and Japan. As its synonym Aruncus aethusifolius it has gained the Royal Horticultural Society's Award of Garden Merit.

Subtaxa 
The following varieties are accepted:
 Aruncus sylvester var. laciniatus (H.Hara) H.Hara – northern Japan
 Aruncus sylvester var. sylvester

References 

aethusifolius
Flora of West Himalaya
Flora of Nepal
Flora of East Himalaya
Flora of Tibet
Flora of South-Central China
Flora of Southeast China
Flora of North-Central China
Flora of Manchuria
Flora of Mongolia
Flora of Korea
Flora of Japan
Flora of Primorsky Krai
Flora of Sakhalin
Flora of the Kuril Islands
Plants described in 1879